Putter Golf  is a golfing simulation video game for the PlayStation. It was published in Japan on August 30, 2001, by D3Publisher and in North America on October 24, 2001, by Agetec and developed by Amedio Co.

The player can play with three others as they play mini golf.

Reception

Putter Golf received negative reviews according to the review aggregation website Metacritic. In Japan, Famitsu gave it a score in total of 17 out 40.

Legacy
The game was later released on the PlayStation Network service for the PlayStation 3, PlayStation Portable and PlayStation Vita in Japan on June 23, 2010; and in North America on August 26, 2014.

Notes

 Known in Japan as

References 

2001 video games
Agetec games
D3 Publisher games
Golf video games
Multiplayer and single-player video games
PlayStation (console) games
PlayStation Network games
Video games developed in Japan